Richard Veverka (born 20 December 1987) is a professional Czech football player who currently plays for FK Ústí nad Labem. He finished among the top scorers in the 2009–10 Czech 2. Liga.

References

1987 births
Living people
Czech footballers
Czech First League players
FK Teplice players
FK Ústí nad Labem players

Association football forwards